Scout Durwood is an American comedian, actress, singer, writer, and director. In 2017, she starred in MTV’s scripted comedy series, Mary + Jane and her debut studio comedy album, Take One Thing Off was released on Blue Élan Records. Her twenty-two episode digital series of the same name was nominated for Best Indie Series at the 2019 YouTube Streamy Awards.
Durwood came out in an interview with Blueelan.com for National Coming Out Day  Scout is one half of the comedy duo ‘Scout + Avery’ who together produce monthly comedy shows at Jam in the Van in Los Angeles, past lineups have included Brett Goldstein (Ted Lasso) and magician Michael Carbonaro (The Carbonaro Effect)

Career
Durwood was a full-time cabaret singer in New York City and in 2008, she competed in Murray Hill's Miss LEZ pageant at the Zipper Factory in New York winning First Runner-up which launched her career in burlesque and cabaret. She moved to Los Angeles in 2012 to pursue a career in film and television.  In 2015, she appeared as one of the six cast members in Oxygen (TV channel)'s unscripted series, Funny Girls. In 2017, she starred in the MTV series, Mary + Jane, created by Deborah Kaplan and Harry Elfont.  Her half-hour comedy special appeared as part of the Epix series, Unprotected Sets in 2018.

Performances
Durwood tours nationally as a comedian, and has been featured at Edinburgh Fringe Festival, Moontower, Bridgetown Comedy Festival, Slamdance Film Festival, and Outfest among others.

References

21st-century American comedians
21st-century American actresses
Amherst College alumni
Living people
American lesbian actresses
1984 births